Cynoglossus dispar, commonly known as the Roundhead tonguesole is a species of tonguefish. It is commonly found in the Indian Ocean, particularly off the coast of India, and Pakistan.

References
Fishbase

Cynoglossidae
Fish described in 1877